The Bhairavnath Battalion is an elite special operation forces Battalion in the Nepalese Army. The battalion was trained by the Israeli Special Forces, IDF, to fulfill a need to establish a special forces wing to modernize the army.

The battalion was involved in special surgical operations against the "then" Maoist terrorist.

Post civil war, the battalion has been a part of special operation forces brigade and is the Parachute regiment.
The Bhairvnath battalion is a part of the no. 10 brigade, also known as the special operation forces brigade. Bhairavnath battalion has its garrison in Maharajgunj, Kathmandu, Bagmati Province. Bhairavnath shares its headquarter with the Nepal army para training school and the special forces battalion also known as the 'Yuddha Bhairav battalion'. Yuddha Bhairav is a special forces battalion whereas Bhairavnath is airborne. Soldiers of Bhairavnath battalion wears "para commando" tabs on their uniforms.

References

Military of Nepal
Nepalese Civil War